John Kerr (7 April 1894 – 8 July 1978), sometimes known as James Kerr or Jock Kerr, was a Scottish professional footballer who played as a wing half in the Football League for Brentford and Blackburn Rovers. In 1946, he was one of the founders of Gretna and was a member of the club's committee.

Personal life 
While with Queen's Park, Kerr worked as a fitter in the Glasgow shipyards.

Career statistics

References

1894 births
Scottish footballers
English Football League players
Association football wing halves
Brentford F.C. players
Queen's Park F.C. players
Blackburn Rovers F.C. players
Solway Star F.C. players
Scottish Football League players
People from Annan, Dumfries and Galloway
1978 deaths
Annan Athletic F.C. players
Machinists